The Battle of Aladzha was a key battle of the Caucasian campaign of the Russo-Turkish War of 1877–78. Russian troops broke through the defenses of the Turkish troops on the Aladzhin heights, which allowed them to seize the initiative and begin the siege of Kars.

References

Bibliography
 James Reid, 2000: Crisis of the Ottoman Empire: Prelude to Collapse 1839-1878. Franz Steiner Verlag 
 Gazi Ahmed Muhtar Paşa, Eski Yazıdan Aktaran, 1996: Sergüzeşt-i Hayatım'ın Cildi-i Sanisi. Yücel Demirel: Tarih Vakfı Yurt Yayınları

External links
 Great Russian Encyclopedia: Avliyar - Aladzhin battle 1877
 Military Encyclopedia of Sytin: Aladzha

Aladzha
Aladzha